Hydroptila icona is a species of microcaddisfly in the family Hydroptilidae. It is found in Central America.

References

Hydroptilidae
Articles created by Qbugbot
Insects described in 1937